Fear and Loathing in Las Vegas: A Savage Journey to the Heart of the American Dream is a 1971 novel in the gonzo journalism style by Hunter S. Thompson. The book is a roman à clef, rooted in autobiographical incidents. The story follows its protagonist, Raoul Duke, and his attorney, Doctor Gonzo, as they descend on Las Vegas to chase the American Dream through a drug-induced haze, all the while ruminating on the failure of the 1960s countercultural movement. The work is Thompson's most famous book, and is noted for its lurid descriptions of illicit drug use and its early retrospective on the culture of the 1960s. Thompson's highly subjective blend of fact and fiction, which it popularized, became known as gonzo journalism. Illustrated by Ralph Steadman, the novel first appeared as a two-part series in Rolling Stone magazine in 1971 before being published in book form in 1972. It was later adapted into a film of the same title in 1998 by director Terry Gilliam, starring Johnny Depp and Benicio del Toro, who portrayed Raoul Duke and Dr. Gonzo, respectively.

Origins

The novel Fear and Loathing in Las Vegas is based on two trips to Las Vegas, Nevada, that Hunter S. Thompson took with attorney and Chicano activist Oscar Zeta Acosta in March and April 1971. The first trip resulted from an exposé Thompson was writing for Rolling Stone magazine about the Mexican–American television journalist Rubén Salazar, whom officers of the Los Angeles County Sheriff's Department had shot and killed with a tear gas grenade fired at close range during the National Chicano Moratorium March against the Vietnam War in 1970. Thompson was using Acosta—a prominent Mexican-American political activist and attorney—as a central source for the story, and the two found it difficult for a brown-skinned Mexican to talk openly with a white reporter in the racially tense atmosphere of Los Angeles, California. The two needed a more comfortable place to discuss the story and decided to take advantage of an offer from Sports Illustrated to write photograph captions for the annual Mint 400 desert race being held in Las Vegas from March 21–23, 1971.

Thompson wrote that he concluded their March trip by spending some 36 hours alone in a hotel room "feverishly writing in my notebook" about his experiences. These writings became the genesis of Fear and Loathing in Las Vegas: A Savage Journey to the Heart of the American Dream.

What originally was a 250-word photo caption assignment for Sports Illustrated grew to a novel-length feature story for Rolling Stone; Thompson said publisher Jann Wenner had "liked the first 20 or so jangled pages enough to take it seriously on its own terms and tentatively scheduled it for publication—which gave me the push I needed to keep working on it." He had first submitted a 2,500-word manuscript to Sports Illustrated that was "aggressively rejected."

Weeks later Thompson and Acosta returned to Las Vegas to report for Rolling Stone on the National District Attorneys Association's Conference on Narcotics and Dangerous Drugs being held from  April 25–29, 1971, and to add material to the larger Fear and Loathing narrative. Besides attending the attorneys' conference, Thompson and Acosta looked for ways in Vegas to explore the theme of the American Dream, which was the basis for the novel's second half, to which Thompson referred at the time as "Vegas II".

On April 29, 1971, Thompson began writing the full manuscript in a hotel room in Arcadia, California, in his spare time while completing "Strange Rumblings in Aztlan," the article chronicling the death of Salazar. Thompson joined the array of Vegas experiences within what he called "an essentially fictional framework" that described a singular free-wheeling trip to Vegas peppered with creative licenses.

In November 1971, Rolling Stone published the combined texts of the trips as Fear and Loathing in Las Vegas: A Savage Journey to the Heart of the American Dream as a two-part story, illustrated by Ralph Steadman, who two years before had worked with Thompson on an article titled "The Kentucky Derby Is Decadent and Depraved". Random House published the hardcover edition in July 1972, with additional illustrations by Steadman; The New York Times said it is "by far the best book yet on the decade of dope," with Tom Wolfe describing it as a "scorching epochal sensation."

Plot
The basic synopsis revolves around journalist Raoul Duke (Hunter S. Thompson) and his attorney, Dr. Gonzo (Oscar Zeta Acosta), as they arrive in Las Vegas in 1971 to report on the Mint 400 motorcycle race for an unnamed magazine. However, this job is repeatedly obstructed by their constant use of a variety of recreational drugs, including LSD, ether, cocaine, alcohol, mescaline, adrenochrome, and cannabis. This leads to a series of bizarre hallucinogenic experiences, during which they destroy hotel rooms, wreck cars, and have visions of anthropomorphic desert animals, all the while ruminating on the decline of both the "American Dream" and the '60s counterculture in a city of greed.

The "wave speech"
The "wave speech" is an important passage at the end of the eighth chapter that captures the hippie zeitgeist and its end.  Thompson often cited this passage during interviews, choosing it when asked to read aloud from the novel.

In High White Notes: The Rise and Fall of Gonzo Journalism, David S. Wills explains how the "wave speech" was influenced by Thompson's use of The Great Gatsby as a literary template. He argues that the entire wave passage replicated the rhythm, not to mention the theme, of the final page and a half of F. Scott Fitzgerald's novel. Thompson himself frequently compared his book to The Great Gatsby.

Title
Fear and Loathing in Las Vegas is Thompson's most famous work, and is known as Fear and Loathing for short; however, he later used the phrase "Fear and Loathing" in the titles of other books, essays, and magazine articles.

Moreover, "Fear and Loathing", as a phrase, has been used by many writers, the first (possibly) being Friedrich Nietzsche in The Antichrist. In a Rolling Stone magazine interview, Thompson said: "It came out of my own sense of fear, and [is] a perfect description of that situation to me, however, I have been accused of stealing it from Nietzsche or Kafka or something. It seemed like a natural thing."

He first used the phrase in a letter to a friend written after the Kennedy assassination, describing how he felt about whoever had shot President John F. Kennedy. In "The Kentucky Derby is Decadent and Depraved", he used the phrase to describe how people regarded Ralph Steadman upon seeing his caricatures of them.

Jann Wenner claims that the title came from Thomas Wolfe's The Web and the Rock.

Another possible influence is Fear and Trembling, a philosophical work by existentialist Søren Kierkegaard published in 1843. The title is a reference to a line from a Bible verse, Philippians 2:12.

Reactions to the novel
When it was published in fall of 1971 many critics did not like the novel's loose plot and the scenes of drug use; however, some reviewers predicted that Fear and Loathing in Las Vegas would become an important piece of American literature.

In The New York Times, Christopher Lehmann-Haupt told readers to not "even bother" trying to understand the novel, and that "what goes on in these pages make[s] Lenny Bruce seem angelic"; instead, he acknowledged that the novel's true importance is in Thompson's literary method: "The whole book boils down to a kind of mad, corrosive prose poetry that picks up where Norman Mailer's An American Dream left off and explores what Tom Wolfe left out".

As the novel became popular the reviews became positive; Crawford Woods, also in The New York Times, wrote a positive review countering Lehmann-Haupt's negative review: the novel is "a custom-crafted study of paranoia, a spew from the 1960s and—in all its hysteria, insolence, insult and rot—a desperate and important book, a wired nightmare, the funniest piece of American prose"; and "this book is such a mind storm that we may need a little time to know that it is also literature... it unfolds a parable of the nineteen-sixties to those of us who lived in them in a mood—perhaps more melodramatic than astute—of social strife, surreal politics and the chemical feast." About Thompson, Woods said he "trusts the authority of his senses, and the clarity of a brain poised between brilliance and burnout".

In any event, Fear and Loathing in Las Vegas became a benchmark in American literature about U.S. society in the early 1970s. In Billboard magazine, Chris Morris said, "Through Duke and Gonzo's drug-addled shenanigans amid the seediness of the desert pleasure palaces, it perfectly captured the zeitgeist of the post–'60s era". In Rolling Stone magazine, Mikal Gilmore wrote that the novel "peers into the best and worst mysteries of the American heart" and that Thompson "sought to understand how the American dream had turned a gun on itself". Gilmore believes that "the fear and loathing Thompson was writing about—a dread of both interior demons and the psychic landscape of the nation around him—wasn't merely his own; he was also giving voice to the mind-set of a generation that had held high ideals and was now crashing hard against the walls of American reality".

Cormac McCarthy has called the book "a classic of our time" and one of the few great modern novels.

As a work of gonzo journalism

In the book The Great Shark Hunt, Thompson refers to Fear and Loathing in Las Vegas as "a failed experiment in the gonzo journalism" he practiced, which was based on William Faulkner's idea that "the best fiction is far more true than any kind of journalism—and the best journalists have always known this". Thompson's style blended the techniques of fictional story-telling and journalism.

He called it a failed experiment because he originally intended to record every detail of the Las Vegas trip as it happened, and then publish the raw, unedited notes; however, he revised it during the spring and summer of 1971. For example, the novel describes Duke attending the motorcycle race and the narcotics convention in a few days' time; the actual events occurred a month apart. Later, he wrote, "I found myself imposing an essentially fictional framework on what began as a piece of straight/crazy journalism".

Nevertheless, critics call Fear and Loathing Thompson's crowning achievement in gonzo journalism. For example, journalist and author Mikal Gilmore said the novel "feels free wheeling when you read it [but] it doesn't feel accidental. The writing is right there, on the page—startling, unprecedented and brilliantly crafted".

Changes in the book version
The novel was first published serially in Rolling Stone magazine, under the byline "Raoul Duke". The book version was published with Thompson's name as the author.

In chapter 8 of part I, Thompson tells a story about his neighbor, "a former acid guru who later claimed to have made that long jump from chemical frenzy to preternatural consciousness". In the Rolling Stone article the neighbor was identified as "Dr. Robert De Ropp on Sonoma Mountain Road". In the book version, the name and the street were redacted, as a footnote says, "at insistence of publisher's lawyer".

In chapter 12 of part II, Thompson tells of a belligerent drunk confronting Bruce Innes, of Canadian folk band The Original Caste, at a club in Aspen. The heckler was identified in the Rolling Stone version as "Wally Schirra, the Astronaut". In the book version he is only identified as "a former Astronaut" and his name is, again, redacted "at insistence of publisher's lawyer".

Illustrations

British artist Ralph Steadman added his unique and grotesque illustrations to the Rolling Stone issues and to the novel. Steadman had first met Thompson when Scanlan's Monthly hired Steadman to do the illustrations for Thompson's first venture into gonzo journalism called "The Kentucky Derby Is Decadent and Depraved."

Many critics have hailed Steadman's illustrations as another main character of the novel and companion to Thompson's disjointed narrative. The New York Times noted that "Steadman's drawings were stark and crazed and captured Thompson's sensibility, his notion that below the plastic American surface lurked something chaotic and violent. The drawings are the plastic torn away and the people seen as monsters."

Steadman has expressed regret at selling the illustrations, at the advice of his agent, to Rolling Stone founder Jann Wenner for the sum of $75, which remained in Wenner's possession until he sold them in 2016.  As a result of that transaction Steadman has largely refused to sell any of his original artwork and has been quoted as saying "If anyone owns a Steadman original, it's stolen." While there are original pieces held outside his archive, they are exceedingly rare.  The artist has kept possession of the vast bulk of his artwork.

Adaptations

Audiobook
An audiobook version was released by Margaritaville Records and Island Records in 1996, on the 25th anniversary of the book's original publication. It features the voice talents of Harry Dean Stanton as the narrator/an older Hunter S. Thompson, Jim Jarmusch as Raoul Duke, and Maury Chaykin as Dr. Gonzo, with Jimmy Buffett, Joan Cusack, Buck Henry and Harry Shearer in minor roles. Sound effects, period-appropriate music and album-like sound mixing are used extensively to give it the surreal feeling characteristic of the book. Quotes from Thompson himself bookend the album.

The album is presumably  out-of-print, due to its relative rarity, but is sought after by fans for its high production values and faithfulness to the book's tone. Excerpts of it were included in the Criterion Collection release of the movie.

Film adaptation

The novel's popularity gave rise to attempted cinematic adaptations; directors Martin Scorsese and Oliver Stone each unsuccessfully attempted to film a version of the novel. In the course of these attempts, Jack Nicholson and Marlon Brando were considered for the roles of Duke and Dr. Gonzo but the production stalled and the actors aged beyond the characters. Afterwards, Dan Aykroyd and John Belushi were considered, but Belushi's death ended that plan.  Art Linson's 1980 film Where the Buffalo Roam starring Bill Murray and Peter Boyle is based on a number of Thompson's stories, including Fear and Loathing in Las Vegas.

In 1989, Fear and Loathing in Las Vegas was almost made by director Terry Gilliam when he was given a script by illustrator Ralph Steadman. Gilliam, however, felt that the script "didn't capture the story properly". In 1995, Gilliam received a different script he felt worth realising; his 1998 film features Johnny Depp and Benicio del Toro as Raoul Duke and Dr. Gonzo respectively. However, criticism was mixed and the film was a box office failure.

Graphic novel 
A graphic novel adaptation of Fear and Loathing in Las Vegas, adapted by Canadian artist Troy Little, was released in October 2015. In interviews, Little said "We decided right off the bat not to go the Steadman route, or be too influenced by the movie either, and draw Johnny Depp and Benicio Del Toro. So we wanted to make it its own unique thing...  For me, capturing the manic energy and spirit of the book, and staying true to the feel of Fear and Loathing was my big goal."

Other references 
"Fear and Loathing on the Planet of Kitson," an episode of the ABC/Marvel Studios superhero series Agents of S.H.I.E.L.D., first broadcast on May 24, 2019, not only takes its title from the novel, it also incorporates plot elements from the novel and 1998 film, particularly around characters having to navigate a casino (in this case a casino on an alien planet) while under the influence of a psychedelic drug.

The 2013 album Too Weird to Live, Too Rare to Die! by Panic! at the Disco (originally from Las Vegas) was named after a line from the book.

The music videos for Lil Wayne's "No Worries" and The Weeknd's song "Heartless" draw heavy inspiration from the 1998 film.

Japanese electronicore band Fear, and Loathing in Las Vegas is named after the book and film.

"Bat Country", from the album City of Evil of the band Avenged Sevenfold, is based on the novel, with the title coming from what Raoul Duke says to Dr. Gonzo after seeing huge bats and flying manta rays in his hallucinations, "We can't stop here. This is bat country." The song’s music video exemplifies that, referencing numerous scenes from the film.

An achievement in Halo: The Master Chief Collection called 'Can't Stop Here, This is Brute Country' is a reference to the line "We can't stop here, this is bat country." from the book and the 1998 film.

A set of cosmetic items in the class-based First-person shooter video game Team Fortress 2 are directly based on one of the outfits that Raoul Duke wears in the book and the 1998 film, both cosmetic items belonging to the Sniper class. The items are named the Hawaiian Hunter and Tropical Camo in-game, respectively.

“Lost” by Frank Ocean references this book according to Genius.

References

External links

 Excerpt from original Rolling Stone article

 Book Review by Nick Christenson
 Las Vegas Sun investigation into the actual historical events surrounding the book. Includes many other FLLV-related articles.
 The American Dream & Hunter Thompson's 'Fear & Loathing' Essay and Review by Lucian K. Truscott IV for the Village Voice originally published July 13, 1972

Novels by Hunter S. Thompson
1971 American novels
American autobiographical novels
Postmodern novels
Psychedelic literature
Roman à clef novels
American novels adapted into films
Picaresque novels
Works originally published in Rolling Stone
Novels first published in serial form
Novels set in the Las Vegas Valley
Novels about drugs
Non-fiction novels of investigative journalism
Random House books
Novels set in Las Vegas